Claude Ennis "Jack" Starrett Jr. (November 2, 1936 – March 27, 1989) was an American actor and film director.

Starrett is perhaps best known for his role as Gabby Johnson, a parody of George "Gabby" Hayes, in the 1974 film Blazing Saddles and is also known for his role as the brutal deputy Art Galt in the 1982 action film First Blood. He also played the cruel foreman Swick in The River.

Starrett acted in the biker films The Born Losers, Hells Angels on Wheels (both from 1967), Angels from Hell (1968) and Hell's Bloody Devils (1970), and directed two more: Run, Angel, Run in 1969 and Nam's Angels (1970) as well as the horror film Race with the Devil (1975) - that was filmed in his home state of Texas - in which he also played a gas station attendant.

Life and career
Starrett was raised in Refugio, Texas and worked in the oil fields before coming to Hollywood. He starred in the 1961 film Like Father Like Son as Coach Jennings, and later reprised the role in The Young Sinner in 1965 and Like Father Like Son in 1987.

Valerie Starrett, his wife at one time, said Jack had always wished to direct rather than act. He made an uncredited first attempt at direction when the original director of The Girls from Thunder Strip.

Throughout his career, Starrett directed feature films and episodes of television programs. In addition, he made guest appearances on TV shows including Hill Street Blues, Hunter, The A-Team, and Knight Rider (in which he made three guest appearances as different characters.) Starrett starred in three short films directed by Tony Schweikle. Starrett and Schweikle stayed close friends until Starrett's death.

He played the mumbling Gabby Johnson in Mel Brooks' 1974 film Blazing Saddles, which was deemed "culturally, historically, or aesthetically significant" by the Library of Congress and was selected for preservation in the National Film Registry.

Death

Starrett died from kidney failure in Sherman Oaks, California at the age of 52. At the time of his death he was married to Valerie Starrett. His daughter is Jennifer Starrett, who is also an actress.

Filmography

Actor

Film

Television

Director

Film

Television

References

External links

Jack Starrett at Find A Grave

1936 births
1989 deaths
American male film actors
American male television actors
Deaths from kidney failure
People from Refugio, Texas
Film directors from Texas
Burials at Forest Lawn Memorial Park (Hollywood Hills)
20th-century American male actors
Blaxploitation film directors